Doctors and Nurses may refer to a children's game of imaginative role-playing where medical profession roles are adopted and acted out. 

It may also refer to:
 Doctors and Nurses (TV series), a British television sitcom
 Doctors and Nurses (film), a 1981 Australian comedy film